Aubrey Geoffrey Frederick Rippon, Baron Rippon of Hexham, PC, QC (28 May 1924 – 28 January 1997) was a British Conservative Party politician. He is most known for drafting the European Communities Act 1972 which took the United Kingdom into the European Communities on 1 January 1973. He was Chairman of the European-Atlantic Group.

Early life
Born in Penn, Buckinghamshire, the son of the Somerset cricketer Sydney Rippon, Geoffrey Rippon was educated at King's College, Taunton, and Brasenose College, Oxford, where he was president of the University Conservative Association. He was called to the Bar in 1948 and was Mayor of Surbiton 1951–52 and a member of the London County Council from 1952, representing Chelsea.  From 1958, he was the leader of the Conservative Party group on the council.

Parliamentary career
After unsuccessfully contesting the seat of Shoreditch and Finsbury in both 1950 and 1951, he became MP for Norwich South in 1955.

As Minister for Public Building and Works in 1962, Rippon controversially sought to demolish and redevelop the Italianate Foreign and Commonwealth Office main building designed in the 1860s by Sir George Gilbert Scott. After a campaign led by  The Victorian Society and a public outcry the decision was overturned and the building was subsequently granted Grade I listed building status.

In 1964 Rippon was defeated, but moved to the constituency of Hexham in Northumberland at the 1966 general election and remained MP there until retiring in 1987. Among his posts in the Shadow Cabinet was that of Shadow Defence Secretary from 1969 to 1970.

In 1970 he became Chancellor of the Duchy of Lancaster under Edward Heath, and being in favour of the Common Market was given the responsibility of negotiating Britain's entry into it. In 1972 he moved to become Secretary of State for the Environment. During his tenure the Department of the Environment was housed on Marsham Street in unattractive tower blocks nicknamed 'the three ugly sisters'. Rippon is supposed to have commented to his civil servants that the view from the top floor was the best in London, as one could not see the towers themselves.

While Secretary of State for the Environment he introduced the Water Act 1973, which amalgamated over 1500 separate private, and local authority water provision, sewage,  water treatment, and regulatory entities into 10 Regional Water Authorities, organised on a natural Hydrological basis.

He was at one time a prominent member of the Conservative Monday Club, for whom he authored a booklet entitled Right Angle, and was guest-of-honour at their Annual Dinner in 1970. The Club was, however, divided on the EEC (European Community) issue, and at their conference in October 1971 members moved and carried a resolution opposing Britain's entry.

From 1979 to 1982, Rippon was President of the European Documentation and Information Centre (CEDI).

He was created a life peer on 5 October 1987 taking the title Baron Rippon of Hexham, of Hesleyside in the County of Northumberland.

Arms

References
 Copping, Robert, The Story of The Monday Club – The First Decade, (Foreword by George Pole), Current Affairs Information Service, Ilford, Essex, April 1972, (P/B).

External links 
 

|-

|-

|-

|-

|-

|-

1924 births
1997 deaths
20th-century English lawyers
Alumni of Brasenose College, Oxford
British Secretaries of State for the Environment
Chancellors of the Duchy of Lancaster
Conservative Party (UK) MEPs
Conservative Party (UK) MPs for English constituencies
Rippon of Hexham
Councillors in Greater London
English King's Counsel
English barristers
MEPs for the United Kingdom 1973–1979
Mayors of places in Greater London
Members of London County Council
Members of the Privy Council of the United Kingdom
Ministers in the Macmillan and Douglas-Home governments, 1957–1964
People educated at King's College, Taunton
People from Chiltern District
Presidents of the Oxford University Conservative Association
UK MPs 1955–1959
UK MPs 1959–1964
UK MPs 1966–1970
UK MPs 1970–1974
UK MPs 1974
UK MPs 1974–1979
UK MPs 1979–1983
UK MPs 1983–1987
Life peers created by Elizabeth II